Circa 2007 (stylized as CIRCA: 2007) is the debut album by Circa, a progressive rock band consisting of then former Yes members Billy Sherwood (bass, vocals), Tony Kaye (keyboards) and Alan White (drums), as well as Jimmy Haun (guitar), who had worked with Yes as a session musician. Billy's elder brother Michael Sherwood also appears. Two tracks are based on material Billy Sherwood and Trevor Rabin were developing in the mid-1990s.

The album was released independently on 30 July 2007.

Tracks listing

Personnel
CIRCA
 Billy Sherwood - bass, lead vocals
 Jimmy Haun - electric & acoustic guitars, backing vocals
 Tony Kaye - keyboards
 Alan White - drums, percussion, backing vocals

Additional musicians
 Cole Coleman - laúd on track 3
 Michael Sherwood - vocoder

 Production
Arranged & Produced By Circa
Recorded, Engineered & Mixed By Billy Sherwood
Studio techs: Ric Luxembourg, Mark Ferguson, John Cox, Scott Walton and everybody at Uncle Studios 
Mastered By Joe Gastwirt

References

External links
Yescography entry

2007 debut albums
Self-released albums